William John Orr (April 22, 1891 – March 10, 1967) was a Major League Baseball infielder. He played primarily at shortstop, but also played all three other infield positions.

After his major league career, Orr played for ten years in the Pacific Coast League.

Sources

Major League Baseball shortstops
Philadelphia Athletics players
Salt Lake City Skyscrapers players
Sacramento Sacts players
Sacramento Wolves players
Mission Wolves players
Salt Lake City Bees players
Sacramento Senators players
Seattle Indians players
Shreveport Gassers players
Minor league baseball managers
Baseball players from San Francisco
1891 births
1967 deaths